Gurmukh Singh may refer to:

 Sepoy Gurmukh Singh IOM, British Indian Empire soldier who died at the Battle of Saragarhi in 1897
 Gurmukh Singh (First World War), British Indian Empire soldier who won the Indian Order of Merit
 Gurmukh Nihal Singh (1895–unknown), Indian politician, first governor of Rajasthan
 Baba Gurmukh Singh, member of the Ghadr Party
 Bhai Gurmukh Singh, leader of the Singh Sabha movement
 Gurmukh Singh Musafir, former Chief Minister of Punjab
 Gurmukh Singh (footballer), Indian footballer